End Like This is an EP by singer-songwriter Rocky Votolato. The EP consists of three B-sides from Votolato's 2006 album, Makers. Recorded in 2004, these songs sat hidden for nearly three years until they saw a digital release in 2007.

Track listing
"20 Degrees" – 3:17
"One Day You Won't Be Here" – 4:18
"End Like This" – 3:38

2007 EPs
Rocky Votolato albums